Çorumlu is a toponym and a Turkish surname. It may refer to:
 Çorumlu, Kastamonu, village in the District of Kastamonu, Kastamonu Province, Turkey

People with the surname
 Çağlar Çorumlu (born 1977), Turkish actor

Turkish-language surnames